Stacy L. Leeds (born 1971) is an American Law professor, scholar, and former Supreme Court Justice for the Cherokee Nation. She served as Dean of the University of Arkansas School of Law,  from 2011-2018, the first Indigenous woman to lead a law school. She was a candidate for Principal Chief of the Cherokee Nation in 2007.

Education
Stacy Leeds earned her MBA from the University of Tennessee Executive MBA program, her Master of Laws degree from the University of Wisconsin and her Juris Doctor degree from University of Tulsa. She earned her Bachelor of Arts degree from Washington University in St. Louis.

Academic and judicial career
Leeds is an experienced leader in law and higher education with expertise in American Indian Law, tribal governance, property, economic development and Cherokee legal history.

Leeds currently serves as the chief judge of the Prairie Band of Potawatomi Nation's District Court, the associate judge of the Kaw Nation's Supreme Court, and the chief justice of the Kickapoo Tribe of Oklahoma's Supreme Court.

Leeds serves on the board of the National American Indian Court Judge's Association and on the National Judicial College's tribal advisory board.

She was the first woman to ever serve as a Cherokee Nation Supreme Court justice after her appointment in 2002. She served on the court until 2006.
 
In the past, she has served as a special judge for the Muscogee Creek Nation's District Court and associate judge of the Turtle Mountain Band of Chippewa Indians's Court of Appeals.

From 2011-2018, Leeds served as the 12th Dean of the University of Arkansas School of Law. She formerly served as Interim Associate Dean for Academic Affairs and Professor of Law at the University of Kansas and the Director of Tribal Law and Government Center at KU. Previously Leeds taught law at the University of North Dakota and served as Director of the Northern Plains Indian Law Center.

She served as the inaugural Vice Chancellor for Economic Development (2017-2020), Dean Emeritus and Professor of Law at the University of Arkansas, providing leadership for campus-wide engagement, collaboration, and outreach to citizens, businesses, governmental and nonprofit entities in Arkansas and beyond. Leeds worked closely with UA's ten colleges, schools and divisions to amplify the university's economic and social impact.

Leeds was appointed Foundation Professor of Law and Leadership for the Sandra Day O’Connor College of Law at Arizona State University in January 2018. Leeds is in ASU Law’s Indian Legal Program.

Honors
Leeds received the Fletcher Fellowship in 2008, when she was also named a nonresident fellow of the W. E. B. Du Bois Institute at Harvard University. While teaching at the University of Wisconsin, she was the William H. Hastie Fellow.

In 2006 Leeds received the AALS Clyde Ferguson Award for Excellence in Teaching, Service, and Scholarship. At KU she received the Immel Award for Teaching Excellence, and she has been named Alumni of the Year from the National Native American Law Students Association.

Personal
She grew up in Muskogee, Oklahoma. She is a citizen of the Cherokee Nation.

Published works
 Leeds, Stacy L. and Angelique Townsend Eaglewoman. Mastering American Indian Law. 2013.
 Leeds, Stacy L. American Indian Property. Durham, NC: Carolina Academic Press, 2008. 
 Leeds, Stacy L., Darrell Dowty, Darell Matlock, and the Cherokee Nation. In the Judicial Appeals Tribunal of the Cherokee Nation: Lucy Allen, petitioner, v. Cherokee Nation Tribal Council, Lela Ummerteskee, registrar, and registration committee, respondents. Tahlequah, OK: Cherokee Nation, 2006.
 Leeds, Stacy L. Cross Jurisdictional Recognition and Enforcement of Judgments. Madison: University of Wisconsin, 2009.

References

External links
Official Stacy Leeds site
Tsalagi Think Tank, maintained by Stacy Leeds

                   

1971 births
20th-century Native Americans
20th-century Native American women
21st-century American lawyers
21st-century Native Americans
21st-century Native American women
American legal scholars
American women academics
Cherokee Nation politicians
Living people
Muscogee people
Native American academics
Native American lawyers
Native American women academics

People from Muskogee, Oklahoma
Scholars of Native American law
University of Tennessee alumni
University of Tulsa College of Law alumni
University of Wisconsin Law School alumni
Washington University in St. Louis alumni